Andries Johannes van Schalkwyk (born 21 December 1984) is a South African-born rugby union player who played internationally for Italy in 2016 and 2017.

He was named in the Italian squad for the 2016 Six Nations Championship.	

In 2009, he played for Southern Kings against British & Irish Lions during 2009 tour.

In 2017, he rejoined Southern Kings for their entry into the Pro14.

Zebre

In the 2012–13 Pro12 season, he played 19 matches, coming on as a substitute for 1, and scoring six tries. For 2013/2014 season he played 17 matches, coming on as substitute for 2 matches.  In the 2014/2015 season he played 12 matches, coming on as substitute for 1. In the 2015-2016 season he played 13 matches, coming on as substitute for 1, scoring 6 tries. He was top try scorer for the season with teammate Kayle van Zyl 2nd top try scorer with 5 tries for Zebre.  In the 2016/2017 season he played 9 matches, substituting for 1, scoring 5 tries and picking up 5 yellow cards. He did not renew his contract with Zebre at the end of the 2016–17 season. and signed with the Southern Kings.

Southern Kings

Van Schalkwyk moves from Zebre to join the Southern Kings in Port Elizabeth on a two-year contract.

References

External links
 

1984 births
Living people
Italian rugby union players
Italy international rugby union players
Southern Kings players
Eastern Province Elephants players
Rugby union flankers
Rugby union number eights
Free State Cheetahs players
Falcons (rugby union) players
Boland Cavaliers players
Blue Bulls players
Golden Lions players
Lions (United Rugby Championship) players
Leopards (rugby union) players
Zebre Parma players